The iHeartRadio Podcast Awards is a podcast awards show that celebrates podcasts heard throughout the year across iHeartMedia radio stations nationwide and on iHeartRadio, iHeartMedia's digital music platform. Founded by iHeartRadio in 2019, the event recognizes the most popular podcasters and podcasts over the past year. Winners are chosen in a few categories by judges, but the majority of categories are voted on by fans through the iHeart Podcast Awards website and social media. The inaugural event was held on January 18, 2019, at the iHeartRadio Theater in Los Angeles.

Overview 
Fans vote on their favorite podcasts through the iHeart Podcast Awards website and social media over the course of a couple of months leading up to the ceremony. A panel of judges who are blue-ribbon podcast industry leaders determines the podcast winners of several of the categories.

List of ceremonies

Award categories 
The categories cover an array of genres, including fiction, religion and spirituality, music, and political podcasts. Categories voted on by judges are indicated with a double dagger.

Current award categories 

 Best Podcast of the Year (2019–present) 
 Best Comedy Podcast (2019–present)
 Best Crime Podcast (2019–present)
 Best Music Podcast (2019–present)
 Best News Podcast (2019–present)
 Best Sports & Recreation Podcast (2020–present)
 Best Overall Host – Male (2020–present)
 Best Overall Host – Female (2020–present)
 Best Business & Finance Podcast (2020–present)
 Best Pop Culture Podcast (2020–present)
 Best Food Podcast (2019–present)
 Best Wellness & Fitness Podcast (2019–present)
 Best History Podcast (2019–present)
 Best Kids & Family Podcast (2019–present)
 Best Fiction Podcast (2020–present)
 Best Science Podcast (2020–present)
 Best Technology Podcast (2020–present)
 Best Ad Read (2020–present)
 Best Political Podcast (2020–present)
 Best TV & Film Podcast (2020–present)
 Best Spanish Language Podcast (2020–present)
 Best Advice/Inspirational Podcast (2020–present)
 Best Beauty & Fashion Podcast (2020–present)
 Best Travel Podcast (2020–present)
 Best Spirituality & Religion Podcast (2020–present)
 Best Green Podcast (2020–present)
 Best Branded Podcast (2019–present)

Past award categories 

 Best Business & Entrepreneurship Podcast (2019)
 Best Entertainment & TV Podcast (2019)
 Best Curiosity (2019)
 Best Health & Fitness Podcast (2019)
 Best LGBTQ Podcast (2019)
 Most Bingeable (2019)
 Best Multi-Cultural Podcast (2019)
 Best Scripted Podcast (2019)
 Best Sports Podcast (2019)
 Best Science & Tech Podcast (2019)
 Breakout Podcast (2019)

Special awards

Podcast Innovator Award 

 2019: Marc Smerling
 2020: Life Kit
 2021: TBD

Podcast Pioneer Award 

 2019: NPR
 2020: Tenderfoot TV's Payne Lindsey and Donald Albright
 2021: TBD

Social Impact Award 

 2019: Ear Hustle
 2020: 1619
 2021: TBD

Multiple wins and nominations 
Most wins (as of 2020)

Most nominations (as of 2020)

Performance

See also 
 iHeartRadio Music Awards
 iHeartRadio Much Music Video Awards
 iHeartRadio Music Festival

References

External links 

 

Awards established in 2019
Podcasting awards